George Calil (born 29 March 1973) is an English actor known for his role in the TV mini-series Band of Brothers, where he portrayed Sergeant James H. "Mo" Alley, Jr.

Early life 
Calil was born in England in 1973. He is the son of Lebanese businessman Ely Calil.

Career 
In 2004, Calil starring in the special drama September Tapes, as Don Larson, American journalist who travels to Afghanistan one year after 9/11, in an effort to learn the truth about the search for Osama Bin Laden. The film premiered and sold at the Sundance Film Festival. Also in 2004 he played the role of Pompey the Great in the remake of the 1960 film Spartacus.

In 2005 he starred in four feature films, Rollin' with the Nines, Pterodactyl, and The Film Maker, and in 2006 he played the lead role of Detective Alex Taylor in the feature film Lycanthropy.

Personal life 
He also starred in the BBC drama, Holby City, in which he played the drug dealing boyfriend of Sandy. Sandy was played by Laura Sadler, who was Calil's girlfriend in real life. In June 2003, 22-year-old Sadler died after falling from the balcony of Calil's London home after the pair had allegedly taken cocaine. Calil was arrested after Sadler's death but he was eventually released without charge after police confirmed they were treating Sadler's death as an accident.

Filmography

Film

Television

References

External links
 

1973 births
British people of Lebanese descent
Living people
George
British male actors